The Chinese government has committed a series of ongoing human rights abuses against Uyghurs and other ethnic and religious minorities in Xinjiang that is often characterized as genocide. Beginning in 2014, the Chinese government, under the administration of Chinese Communist Party (CCP) General Secretary Xi Jinping, incarcerated more than an estimated one million Turkic Muslims without any legal process in internment camps. Operations from 2016 to 2021 were led by Xinjiang CCP Secretary Chen Quanguo, who dramatically increased the scale and scope of the camps. This is the largest-scale detention of ethnic and religious minorities since World War II. Experts estimate that, since 2017, some sixteen thousand mosques have been razed or damaged, and hundreds of thousands of children have been forcibly separated from their parents and sent to boarding schools.

Government policies have included the arbitrary detention of Uyghurs in state-sponsored internment camps, forced labor, suppression of Uyghur religious practices, political indoctrination, severe ill-treatment, forced sterilization, forced contraception, and forced abortion. Chinese government statistics reported that from 2015 to 2018, birth rates in the mostly Uyghur regions of Hotan and Kashgar fell by more than 60%. In the same period, the birth rate of the whole country decreased by 9.69%. Chinese authorities acknowledged that birth rates dropped by almost a third in 2018 in Xinjiang, but denied reports of forced sterilization and genocide. Birth rates in Xinjiang fell a further 24% in 2019, compared to a nationwide decrease of 4.2%.

These actions have been described as the forced assimilation of Xinjiang, or as an ethnocide or cultural genocide, or as genocide. Those accusing China of genocide point to intentional acts committed by the Chinese government that they say run afoul of Article II of the Genocide Convention, which prohibits "acts committed with intent to destroy, in whole or in part," a "racial or religious group" including "causing serious bodily or mental harm to members of the group" and "measures intended to prevent births within the group".

The Chinese government denies having committed human rights abuses in Xinjiang. In an assessment by the UN Human Rights Office, the United Nations (UN) stated that China's policies and actions in the Xinjiang region may be crimes against humanity, although it did not use the term genocide. International reactions have varied. In 2020, 39 UN member states issued statements to the United Nations Human Rights Council criticizing China's policies, while 45 countries expressed support China's policies and opposing ""the politicization of human rights issues and double standards". In December 2020, a case brought to the International Criminal Court was dismissed because the crimes alleged appeared to have been "committed solely by nationals of China within the territory of China, a State which is not a party to the Statute", meaning the ICC couldn't investigate them. The United States has declared the human rights abuses a genocide, announcing its finding on January 19, 2021. Legislatures in several countries have since passed non-binding motions describing China's actions as genocide, including the House of Commons of Canada, the Dutch parliament, the House of Commons of the United Kingdom, the Seimas of Lithuania, and the French National Assembly. Other parliaments, such as those in New Zealand, Belgium, and the Czech Republic condemned the Chinese government's treatment of Uyghurs as "severe human rights abuses" or crimes against humanity.

Background

Uyghur identity

Uyghurs are a Turkic ethnic group native to Xinjiang. They are distinct from the Han Chinese, the predominant ethnic group in China. Uyghurs are the second-largest predominantly Muslim ethnicity in China and Islam is an important aspect of Uyghur identity. The Uyghur language has around 10 million speakers and is shared with other minority groups in the region.

Xinjiang conflict 

Both Uyghurs and the predominantly Han government lay claim to Xinjiang. This prompted an ethnic conflict featuring resistance and sporadic violence as Uyghurs sought greater autonomy. Sinologists Anna Hayes and Michael Clarke have described Xinjiang as undergoing a process of transition as the Chinese government attempted to transform it from a frontier region to an "integral" province of a unitary Chinese state.

Imperial China

Historically, certain Chinese dynasties exerted control over parts of modern-day Xinjiang. The region came under Chinese rule as a result of the westward expansion of the Manchu-led Qing dynasty during the 1700s, which also saw the conquests of Tibet and Mongolia. Xinjiang was a peripheral part of the Qing empire and briefly regained independence during the Dungan Revolt (1862–1877).

Republican Era (1912–1949)
The region was semi-autonomous during the Republic of China's Warlord Era (1916–1928), with parts controlled by the Kumul Khanate, the Ma Clique and later the warlord Jin Shuren. In 1933, the breakaway First East Turkestan Republic was established in the Kumul Rebellion, but was conquered the following year by warlord Sheng Shicai with the help of Soviet aid. In 1944, the Ili Rebellion led to the establishment of the Second East Turkestan Republic, which was dependent on the Soviet Union until it was absorbed into the People's Republic of China in 1949.

People's Republic of China (1949–present)

From the 1950s to the 1970s, the Chinese government sponsored a mass migration of Han Chinese to Xinjiang and introduced policies designed to suppress cultural identity and religion in the region. During this period, Uyghur independence organizations emerged with some support from the Soviet Union, with the East Turkestan People's Party being the largest in 1968. During the 1970s, the Soviets supported the United Revolutionary Front of East Turkestan (URFET) against the Han Chinese.

During the 1980s under Deng Xiaoping, the PRC pursued a new policy of cultural liberalization in Xinjiang and adopted a flexible language policy nationally. Despite a positive response among party officials and minority groups, the Chinese government viewed this policy as unsuccessful and from the mid-1980s its official pluralistic language policy became increasingly subordinate to a covert policy of minority assimilation motivated by geopolitical concerns. Consequently, and in Xinjiang particularly, multilingualism and cultural pluralism were restricted to favor a "monolingual, monocultural model", which in turn helped to embed and strengthen an oppositional Uyghur identity. Attempts by the Chinese state to encourage economic development in the region by exploiting natural resources led to ethnic tension and discontent within Xinjiang over the region's lack of autonomy. In April 1990, a violent uprising in Barin, near Kashgar, was suppressed by the People's Liberation Army (PLA), involving a large number of deaths. Writing in 1998, political scientist Barry Sautman considered policies designed to reduce inequality between Han Chinese and ethnic minorities in Xinjiang unsuccessful at eliminating conflicts because they were shaped by the "paternalistic and hierarchical approach to ethnic relations adopted by the Chinese government".

In February 1997, a police roundup and execution of 30 suspected "separatists" during Ramadan led to large demonstrations, which led to a PLA crackdown on protesters resulting in at least nine deaths in what became known as the Ghulja incident. The Ürümqi bus bombings later that month killed nine people and injured 68, with Uyghur exile groups claiming responsibility. In March 1997, a bus bomb killed two people, with responsibility claimed by Uyghur separatists and the Turkey-based "Organisation for East Turkistan Freedom".

The July 2009 Ürümqi riots broke out in response to the Shaoguan incident, a violent dispute between Uyghur and Han Chinese workers in a factory, which resulted in over one hundred deaths. Following the riots, Uyghur terrorists killed dozens of Han Chinese in coordinated attacks from 2009 to 2016. These included the September 2009 Xinjiang unrest, the 2011 Hotan attack, the 2014 Kunming attack, the April 2014 Ürümqi attack, and the May 2014 Ürümqi attack. The attacks were conducted by Uyghur separatists, with some orchestrated by the Turkistan Islamic Party (a UN-designated terrorist organization, formerly called the East Turkistan Islamic Movement).

Following the Ürümqi riots, Turkish Prime Minister Recep Tayyip Erdogan denounced the "savagery" being inflicted on the Uyghur community and called for an end of the Chinese government's attempts to forcibly assimilate the community. Later at the Group of Eight summit in Italy, Erdogan called upon Chinese authorities to intervene to protect the  community and stated that "The incidents in China are, simply put, a genocide. There's no point in interpreting this otherwise." As a result of Erdogan's statements, China's relations with Turkey deteriorated temporarily.

Government policies

Initial "Strike Hard Campaign Against Violent Terrorism"

During the run-up to the 2008 Beijing Olympics, the Chinese state began to emphasize weiwen (stability maintenance) which led to an intensification of repression across the country. Some within the Party warned that increased action to combat instability which might not even exist could lead to a spiral of repression and unrest.

In April 2010, after the July 2009 Ürümqi riots, Zhang Chunxian replaced the former CCP secretary Wang Lequan, who had been behind religious policies in Xinjiang for 14 years. Following the unrest, party theorists began to call for implementing a more monocultural society with a single "state-race" which would allow China to become "a new type of superpower". Policies to further this goal were first implemented by Zhang Chunxian. Following an attack in Yunnan Province, Xi Jinping told the politburo "We should unite the people to build a copper and iron wall against terrorism", and "Make terrorists like rats scurrying across the street, with everybody shouting, 'Beat them!'" In April 2014, Xi traveled to Xinjiang and told police in Kashgar that "We must be as harsh as them, and show absolutely no mercy." A suicide bombing occurred in Ürümqi on the last day of his visit.

In 2014, a secret meeting of Communist Party leadership was held in Beijing to find a solution to the problem, which would become known as the Strike Hard Campaign Against Violent Terrorism. In May 2014, China publicly launched the campaign in Xinjiang in response to growing tensions between the Han Chinese and the Uyghur populations of Xinjiang. In announcing the campaign, CCP general secretary Xi Jinping stated that "practice has proved that our party's ruling strategy in Xinjiang is correct and must be maintained in the long run".

In 2016, there was a brief window of opportunity for Uyghurs with passports to leave China; many did so but had to leave relatives and children without passports behind. Many of these families have not been reunited.

Following guidance from Beijing, Party leadership in Xinjiang commenced a "People's War" against the "Three Evil Forces" of separatism, terrorism, and extremism. They deployed two hundred thousand party cadres to Xinjiang and launched the Civil Servant-Family Pair Up program. Xi was dissatisfied with the initial results of the People's War and replaced Zhang Chunxian with Chen Quanguo in 2016. Following his appointment Chen oversaw the recruitment of tens of thousands of additional police officers and the division of society into three categories: trusted, average, and untrustworthy. He instructed his subordinates to "Take this crackdown as the top project", and "to preempt the enemy, to strike at the outset".

Regulations since 2017

Following a meeting with Xi in Beijing, Chen Quanguo held a rally in Ürümqi with ten thousand troops, helicopters, and armored vehicles. As they paraded he announced a "smashing, obliterating offensive," and declared that they would "bury the corpses of terrorists and terror gangs in the vast sea of the People's War." He ordered them to "Round up everyone who should be rounded up," and by April 2017 mass arrests had begun.

New bans and regulations were implemented on April 1, 2017. Abnormally long beards and the wearing of veils in public were both banned. Not watching state-run television or listening to radio broadcasts, refusing to abide by family planning policies, or refusing to allow one's children to attend state-run schools were all prohibited.

In 2017, China's Ministry of Public Security began to procure race-based monitoring systems which could reportedly identify whether or not an individual was Uyghur. Despite its questionable accuracy, this allowed a "Uyghur alarm" to be added to surveillance systems. Enhanced border controls were also implemented with guilt being presumed in the absence of evidence, according to Zhu Hailun, who said, "If suspected terrorism cannot be ruled out, then a border control should be implemented to insure the person's arrest".

In 2017, 73% of foreign journalists in China reported being restricted or prohibited from reporting in Xinjiang, up from 42% in 2016.

Alleged "re-education" efforts began in 2014 and were expanded in 2017. Chen ordered that the camps "be managed like the military and defended like a prison". At this time, internment camps were built for the housing of students of the "re-education" programs, most of whom were Uyghurs. The Chinese government did not acknowledge their existence until 2018 and called them "vocational education and training centers". From 2019, the government began referring to them as "vocational training centers". The camps tripled in size from 2018 to 2019 despite the Chinese government stating that most of the detainees had been released.

The use of vocational and education training centers appears to have ended in 2019 following international pressure. Although no comprehensive independent surveys of vocational training centers have been performed as of October 2022, spot checks by journalists have found such sites converted or abandoned. In 2022, a Washington Post reporter checked a dozen sites previously identified as reeducation centers and found "[m]ost of them appeared to be empty or converted, with several sites labeled as coronavirus quarantine facilities, teachers’ schools and vocational schools."

Propaganda campaign 
The Chinese government has engaged in a propaganda campaign to defend its actions in Xinjiang. China initially denied the existence of the Xinjiang internment camps and attempted to cover-up their existence. In 2018, after widespread reporting forced it to admit that the Xinjiang internment camps exist, the Chinese government initiated a campaign to portray the camps as humane and to deny that human rights abuses occurred in Xinjiang. In 2020 and 2021, the propaganda campaign expanded due to rising international backlash against government policies in Xinjiang, with the Chinese government worrying that it no longer had control of the narrative.

Chinese authorities have responded to allegations of abuse by Uyghur women by mounting attacks on their credibility and character. This included the disclosure of confidential medical data and personal information in an attempt to slander witnesses and undermine their testimony. The goal of these attacks appeared to be to silence further criticism, rather than to refute specific claims made by critics. Presentations given by Xinjiang's publicity department and the Ministry of Foreign Affairs to dispel allegations of abuse are closed to foreign journalists and feature pre-recorded questions as well as pre-recorded monologues from people in Xinjiang, including relatives of witnesses.

Chinese government propaganda attacks have also targeted international journalists covering human rights abuses in Xinjiang. After providing coverage critical of Chinese government abuses in Xinjiang, BBC News reporter John Sudworth was subjected to a campaign of propaganda and harassment by Chinese state-affiliated and CCP-affiliated media. The public attacks resulted in Sudworth and his wife Yvonne Murray, who reports for Raidió Teilifís Éireann, fleeing China for Taiwan fearing for their safety.

The Chinese government has used social media as a part of its extensive propaganda campaign. China has spent heavily to purchase Facebook advertisements in order to spread propaganda designed to incite doubt on the existence and scope of human rights violations occurring within Xinjiang. Douyin, the mainland Chinese sister app to ByteDance-owned social media app TikTok, presents users with significant amounts of Chinese state propaganda pertaining to the human rights abuses in Xinjiang. Between July 2019 and early August 2019, CCP-owned tabloid the Global Times paid Twitter to promote tweets that denied that the Chinese government was committing human rights abuses in Xinjiang; Twitter later banned advertising from state-controlled media outlets on August 19 after removing large numbers of pro-Beijing bots from the social network.

In April 2021, the Chinese government released 5 propaganda videos titled, "Xinjiang is a Wonderful Land", and released a musical titled "The Wings of Songs" which portrayed Xinjiang as harmonious and peaceful. The Wings of Songs portrays "a rural idyll of ethnic cohesion devoid of repression, mass surveillance" and without Islam. 

In October 2022, the Australian Strategic Policy Institute documented a number of CCP-backed Uyghur influencers in Xinjiang posting propaganda videos on Chinese and Western social media which pushed back against abuse allegations. Some of the influencers' accounts were suspended on Twitter for alleged inauthenticity.

Counter-terrorism justification
China has used the global "war on terror" of the 2000s to frame "separatist" and ethnic unrest as acts of Islamist terrorism to legitimize its policies in Xinjiang. Scholars such as Sean Roberts and David Tobin have described Islamophobia and fear of terrorism as discourses that have been used within China to justify repressive policies targeting Uyghurs, arguing that violence against Uyghurs should be seen in the context of Chinese colonialism, rather than exclusively as a part of an anti-terrorism campaign.

Arienne Dwyer has written that the US war on terror gave China an opportunity to characterise and "conflate" Uyghur nationalism with terrorism, particularity through the use of state-run media. Dwyer argues that the influence of fundamentalist forms of Islam such as Salafism within Xinjiang is overstated by China as it is tempered by Uyghur Sufism.

In December 2015, the Associated Press reported that China had effectively expelled Ursula Gauthier, a French journalist, "for questioning the official line equating ethnic violence in the western Muslim region with global terrorism". Gauthier, who was the first foreign journalist forced to leave China since 2012, was subject to what the AP described as an "abusive and intimidating campaign" by Chinese state media that accused her of "having hurt the feelings of the Chinese people" and that a Chinese Foreign Ministry spokesman accused her of emboldening terrorism.

In August 2018, the United Nations Committee on the Elimination of Racial Discrimination decried the "broad definition of terrorism and vague references to extremism" used by Chinese legislation, noting that there were numerous reports of detention of large numbers of ethnic Uyghurs and other Muslim minorities on the "pretext of countering terrorism".

In 2019, the editorial board of The Wall Street Journal, Sam Brownback, and Nathan Sales each said that the Chinese government consistently misused "counterterrorism" as a pretext for cultural suppression and human rights abuses.

In 2021, Shirzat Bawudun, the former head of the Xinjiang department of justice, and Sattar Sawut, the former head of the Xinjiang education department, were sentenced to death with two years reprieve on terrorism and extremism charges. Three other educators and two textbook editors were given lesser sentences.

Cultural effects

Mosques 

Mosques, Muslim shrines, and cemeteries in Xinjiang have been the target of systematic destruction. An estimated 16,000 mosques have been destroyed or damaged, minarets have been knocked down and "decorative features scrubbed away or painted over".

In 2005, Human Rights Watch reported that "information scattered in official sources suggests that retaliation" against mosques not sponsored by the Chinese state was prevalent and that the Xinjiang Party Secretary expressed that Uyghurs "should not have to build new places for religious activities". The Chinese government prohibited minors from participating in religious activities in Xinjiang in a manner that, according to Human Rights Watch, "has no basis in Chinese law".

According to an analysis from The Guardian, over one-third of mosques and religious sites in China suffered "significant structural damage" between 2016 and 2018, with nearly one-sixth of all mosques and shrines completely razed. This included the tomb of Imam Asim, a mud tomb in the Taklamakan Desert, and the Ordam shrine at the mazar of Ali Arslan Khan. According to The Guardian, Uyghur Muslims believe that repeated pilgrimages to these tombs fulfill a Muslim's obligation to complete the Hajj. In 2019, Bellingcat reported that "there is systematic repression and imprisonment of the Muslim Uighur minority in Xinjiang, and the destruction of cultural and religiously significant Islamic buildings in this province may be a further part of this ongoing repression." In the same year, Indonesian scholar Said Aqil Siradj disputed that Uyghurs faced persecution, saying there was an increasing number of mosques being built and repaired in Xinjiang.

Id Kah Mosque in Xinjiang is China's largest. Radio Free Asia, a United States government-funded broadcaster, reported that in 2018, a plaque containing Quranic scriptures, that had long hung outside the front entrance of the mosque, had been removed by the authorities. Turghunjan Alawudun, director of the World Uyghur Congress, said the plaque was removed as "one aspect of the Chinese regime's evil policies meant to eliminate the Islamic faith among Uyghurs... and Uyghurs themselves". Anna Fifield of The Independent wrote in 2020 that Kashgar no longer had any working mosques, while The Globe and Mail reported that the only services at the Id Kah mosque, which had been turned into a tourist attraction, were staged to give foreign visitors the impression that religion was being practiced freely and that mosque attendance numbered only in the dozens. Indonesian outlet Antara released a video in 2021 documenting that 800 worshipers were in the mosque, but also that there was no iftar ritual due to pandemic restrictions.

Radio Free Asia reported that starting from early 2020, in response to international criticism, Chinese authorities started limited easing of religious restrictions in Xinjiang, reopening some mosques that were closed down. However, the broadcaster said that most Uyghurs have not returned to the mosques, fearful of their experiences in the previous crackdowns. It also said that Hui Muslims were given greater leeway than Uyghur Muslims.

Education 

In 2011, schools in Xinjiang transitioned to what officials called a policy of bilingual education. The primary medium of instruction is Standard Chinese, with only a few hours a week devoted to Uyghur literature. Despite this policy, few Han children are taught to speak Uyghur.

Uyghur students are increasingly attending residential schools far from their home communities where they cannot speak Uyghur. According to a 2020 report from Radio Free Asia (RFA), monolingual Chinese language education has been introduced in an influential high school in Kashgar that formerly provided bilingual education.

Sayragul Sauytbay, an ethnic Kazakh teacher who later fled China, described how she was forced to teach at an internment camp, saying the camp was "cramped and unhygienic" with her detainee students given only basic sustenance. Sauytbay added that authorities forced the detainees to learn Chinese, sit through indoctrination classes, and make public confessions. She mentioned that rape and torture were commonplace and that authorities forced detainees to take a medicine that left some individuals sterile or cognitively impaired.

In 2021, the standard Uyghur language textbooks used in Xinjiang since the early 2000s were outlawed and their authors and editors sentenced to death or life imprisonment on separatism charges. The textbooks had been created and approved by relevant government officials; however, according to the AP in 2021, the Chinese government said that the "2003 and 2009 editions of the textbooks contained 84 passages preaching ethnic separatism, violence, terrorism and religious extremism and that several people were inspired by the books to participate in a bloody anti-government riot in the regional capital Urumqi in 2009".

Detained academics and religious figures 

In 2019 the Uyghur Human Rights Project identified 386 Uyghur intellectuals who had been imprisoned, detained, or disappeared since early 2017.

Uyghur economist Ilham Tohti was sentenced to life in prison in 2014. Amnesty International called his sentence unjustified and deplorable. Rahile Dawut, a prominent Uyghur anthropologist who studied and preserved Islamic shrines, traditional songs, and folklore, disappeared.

RFA reported that the Chinese government jailed Uyghur Imam Abduheber Ahmet after he took his son to a religious school not sanctioned by the state. They reported that Ahmet had previously been lauded by China as a "five-star" imam but was sentenced in 2018 to over five years in prison for his action.

Cemeteries
In September 2019, Agence France-Presse (AFP) visited 13 destroyed cemeteries across four cities and witnessed exposed bones remaining in four of them. Through an examination of satellite images, the press agency determined that the grave destruction campaign had been ongoing for more than a decade. According to a previous AFP report, three cemeteries in Xayar County were among dozens of Uyghur cemeteries destroyed in Xinjiang between 2017 and 2019. The unearthed human bones from the cemeteries in Xayar County were discarded. In January 2020, a CNN report based on an analysis of Google Maps satellite imagery said that Chinese authorities had destroyed more than 100 graveyards in Xinjiang, primarily Uyghur ones. CNN linked the destruction of the cemeteries to the government's campaign to control the Uyghurs and Muslims more broadly. The Chinese government claimed that the cemetery and tomb destruction were relocations due to lack of maintenance and that the dead were re-interred in new standardized cemeteries.

Among the destroyed cemeteries is Sultanim Cemetery, the central Uyghur historical graveyard with generations of burials, and the most sacred shrine in Hotan city, which was demolished and converted into a parking lot between 2018 and 2019. China Global Television Network (CGTN), a Chinese state-owned international channel affiliated with the Chinese Communist Party, said that the graves were relocated.

Marriage 
According to gender studies expert Leta Hong Fincher, the Chinese government offered Uyghur couples incentives to have fewer children, and for women to marry non-Uyghurs. According to the outreach coordinator for the U.S.-based Uyghur Human Rights Project, Zubayra Shamseden, the Chinese government "wants to erase Uighur culture and identity by remaking its women."

Marriages between Uyghurs and Han are encouraged with government subsidies. In August 2014, local authorities in Cherchen County (Qiemo County) announced, "Incentive Measures Encouraging Uighur-Chinese Intermarriage," including a 10,000 CNY (US$1,450) cash reward per annum for the first five years to such intermarried couples as well as preferential treatment in employment and housing plus free education for the couples, their parents and offspring. County CCP Secretary Zhu Xin remarked:

In October 2017, the marriage of a Han man from Henan Province to a Uyghur woman from Lop County was celebrated on the county's social media page:

University of Washington anthropologist and China expert Darren Byler said that a social media campaign in 2020 to marry off 100 Uyghur women to Han men indicated that, "a certain racialized power dynamic is a part of this process," commenting, "It does seem as though this is an effort to produce greater assimilation and diminish ethnic difference by pulling Uighurs into Han-dominated relationships."

According to RFA reports, in March 2017 Salamet Memetimin, an ethnic Uyghur and the Communist Party Secretary for Chaka township's Bekchan village in Qira County, Hotan Prefecture, was relieved of her duties for taking her nikah marriage vows at her home. In interviews with RFA in 2020, residents and officials of Shufu County (Kona Sheher), Kashgar Prefecture (Kashi) stated that it was no longer possible to perform traditional Uyghur nikah marriage rites in the county.

Clothing 

Chinese authorities discourage the wearing of headscarves, veils, and other customary Islamic attire. On May 20, 2014, a protest broke out in Alakaga (Alaqagha, Alahage), Kuqa (Kuchar, Kuche), Aksu Prefecture when 25 women and schoolgirls were detained for wearing headscarves. According to a local official, two died and five were injured when police fired on protesters. Subsequently, a Washington Post team was detained in Alakaga and ultimately deported from the region.

Documents leaked from the Xinjiang internment camps have noted that some inmates have been detained for wearing traditional clothing.

Children's names 

RFA reported that in 2015, a list of banned names for children called "Naming Rules for Ethnic Minorities", was promulgated in Hotan, banning potential names including "Islam", "Quran", "Mecca", "Jihad", "Imam", "Saddam", "Hajj", and "Medina". Use of the list was later extended throughout Xinjiang. Legislation in 2017 made it illegal to give children names that the Chinese government deemed to "exaggerate religious fervor". This prohibition included a ban on naming children "Muhammad".

Human rights abuses

Inside internment camps

Mass detention 

The Xinjiang internment camps are a part of the Chinese government's strategy to govern Xinjiang through the detention of ethnic minorities en masse.

In 2021, CNN published an interview with a former Xinjiang police officer identified as "Jiang", who said that, when the police planned to raid a Uyghur village, they would sometimes arrange for the entire village to gather for a meeting with their chief so that the police could show up and arrest everyone, while on other occasions the police would go door-to-door with rifles and pull all the residents from their homes overnight. Once the police had arrested people, they would interrogate and beat every man, woman, and child over age 14 "until they kneel on the floor crying."

Researchers and organizations have made various estimates of the number of Xinjiang internment camp detainees. In 2018, United Nations Committee on the Elimination of Racial Discrimination vice chairperson Gay McDougall indicated that around 1 million Uyghurs were being held in internment camps. In September 2020, a Chinese government white paper revealed that an average of 1.29 million workers went through "vocational training" per year between 2014 and 2019, though it does not specify how many of the people received the training in camps or how many times they went through training. Adrian Zenz stated that this "gives us a possible scope of coercive labor" occurring in Xinjiang. There have been multiple reports that mass deaths have occurred inside the camps.

In March 2019, Adrian Zenz told the United Nations that 1.5 million Uyghurs had been detained in camps, saying that the number accounted for the increases in the size and scope of detention in the region and public reporting on the stories of Uyghur exiles with family in interment camps. In July 2019, Zenz wrote in a paper published by the Journal of Political Risk that 1.5 million Uyghurs had been extrajudicially detained, which he described as being "an equivalent to just under one in six adult members of a Turkic and predominantly Muslim minority group in Xinjiang." In November 2019, Zenz estimated that the number of internment camps in Xinjiang had surpassed 1,000. In July 2020, Zenz wrote in Foreign Policy that his estimate had increased since November 2019, estimating that a total of 1.8 million Uyghurs and other Muslim minorities had been extrajudicially detained in what he described as "the largest incarceration of an ethnoreligious minority since the Holocaust", arguing that the Chinese Government was engaging in policies in violation of the United Nations Convention on the Prevention and Punishment of the Crime of Genocide.

According to 2020 study by Joanne Smith Finley, "political re-education involves coercive Sinicization, deaths in the camps through malnutrition, unsanitary conditions, withheld medical care, and violence (beatings); rape of male and female prisoners; and, since the end of 2018, transfers of the most recalcitrant prisoners – usually young, religious males – to high-security prisons in Xinjiang or inner China. Other camp 'graduates' have been sent into securitized forced labour. Those who remain outside the camps have been terrified into religious and cultural self-censorship through the threat of internment."

Ethan Gutmann estimated in December 2020 that 5 to 10 percent of detainees had died each year in the camps.

Torture 

China has subjected Uyghurs living in Xinjiang to torture. A former Chinese police detective, exiled in Europe, revealed to CNN in 2021 details of the systematic torture of Uyghurs in detention camps in Xinjiang, acts in which he had participated, and the fear of his own arrest had he dissented while in China.

Mihrigul Tursun, a young Uyghur mother, said that she was "tortured and subjected to other brutal conditions." In 2018, Tursun gave an interview during which she described her experience while at the camps; she was drugged, interrogated for days without sleep, subjected to intrusive medical examinations, and strapped in a chair and received electric shocks. It was her third time being sent to a camp since 2015. Tursun told reporters that she remembered interrogators tell her "Being a Uighur is a crime." A spokesperson for the Chinese Foreign Ministry, Hua Chunying, has stated that Tursun was taken into custody by police on "suspicion of inciting ethnic hatred and discrimination" for a period lasting 20 days, but denies that Tursun was ever detained in an internment camp.

Another past detainee, Kayrat Samarkand, said that "[t]hey made me wear what they called 'iron clothes,' a suit made of metal that weighed over ... It forced my arms and legs into an outstretched position. I couldn't move at all, and my back was in terrible pain...They made people wear this thing to break their spirits. After 12 hours, I became so soft, quiet and lawful."

Waterboarding is reportedly among the forms of torture which have been used as part of the indoctrination process.

Compulsory sterilizations and contraception 
In 2019, reports of forced sterilization in Xinjiang began to surface. Zumrat Dwut, a Uyghur woman, says that she was forcibly sterilized by tubal ligation during her time in a camp before her husband was able to get her out through requests to Pakistani diplomats. The Xinjiang regional government denies that she was forcibly sterilized.

In 2020, the Associated Press interviewed seven former detainees from internment camps who said they had been forced to take birth control pills or injected with fluids without explanation, which caused women to stop getting periods. The AP suggested the fluid may have been the hormonal medication Depo-Provera, which is commonly used in Xinjiang hospitals for birth control.

In April 2021, exiled Uyghur doctor Gülgine reported that forced sterilization of ethnic Uyghurs persisted since the 1980s. Since 2014, there was an indication for a sharp increase in sterilization of Uyghur women to ensure that Uyghurs would remain a minority in the region. Gülgine said "On some days there were about 80 surgeries to carry out forced sterilizations". She presented intrauterine devices (IUDs) and remarked that "these devices were inserted into women's wombs" to forcibly cause infertility.

Brainwashing 
Former detainee Kayrat Samarkand described his camp routine in an article for NPR in 2018: "In addition to living in cramped quarters, he says inmates had to sing songs praising Chinese leader Xi Jinping before being allowed to eat. He says detainees were forced to memorize a list of what he calls '126 lies' about religion: 'Religion is opium, religion is bad, you must believe in no religion, you must believe in the Communist Party,' he remembers. 'Only [the] Communist Party could lead you to the bright future.'"

Documents which were leaked to The New York Times by an anonymous Chinese official advised that "Should students ask whether their missing parents had committed a crime, they are to be told no, it is just that their thinking has been infected by unhealthy thoughts. Freedom is only possible when this 'virus' in their thinking is eradicated and they are in good health."

The Heritage Foundation reported that "children whose parents are detained in the camps are often sent to state-run orphanages and brainwashed to forget their ethnic roots. Even if their parents are not detained, Uyghur children need to move to inner China and immerse themselves into the Han culture under the Chinese government's 'Xinjiang classrooms' policy."

In 2021, Gulbahar Haitiwaji reported being coerced into denouncing her family after her daughter had been photographed at a protest in Paris.

Forced labor 
According to Quartz, the Xinjiang region is described by the Uyghur Human Rights Project as a cotton gulag' where prison labor is present in all steps of the cotton supply chain..."

Tahir Hamut, a Uyghur, worked in a labor camp during elementary school when he was a child, and he later worked in a labor camp as an adult, performing tasks such as picking cotton, shoveling gravel, and making bricks. "Everyone is forced to do all types of hard labor or face punishment," he said. "Anyone unable to complete their duties will be beaten."

The report noted that "[f]ourteen million square feet of new factories were built in 2018 alone" within the camps and that "former detainees said they were never given a choice about working, and that they earned a pittance or no pay at all".

A Chinese website hosted by Baidu has posted job listings for transferring Uyghur laborers in batches of 50 to 100 people. The 2019 Five Year Plan of the Xinjiang government has an official "labour transfer programme" "to provide more employment opportunities for the surplus rural labour force". These batches of Uyghurs are under "half-military" style management and direct supervision. A seafood processing plant owner said that the Uyghur workforce in his factory had left for Xinjiang due to the COVID-19 pandemic and were paid and housed properly. At least 83 companies were found to have profited from Uyghur labor. Company responses included pledges of ensuring that it does not happen again by checking supply lines, such as Marks & Spencer. Samsung said that it would ensure that previous controls ensured good work conditions under its code of conduct. Apple, Esprit, and Fila did not offers responses to related inquiries.

The Chinese government is reported to have pressured foreign companies to reject claims of abuses. Apple was asked by the Chinese government to censor Uyghur-related news apps among others, on its devices sold in China. Companies such as Nike and Adidas were boycotted in China after they criticized the treatment of Uyghurs, which resulted in significant drop in sales.

Medical experiments
Former inmates have said that they were subjected to medical experimentation.

Organized mass rape and sexual torture 
BBC News and other sources reported accounts of organized mass rape and sexual torture carried out by Chinese authorities in the internment camps.

Multiple women who were formerly detained in the Xinjiang internment camps have publicly made accusations of systemic sexual abuse, including rape, gang rape, and sexual torture, such as forced vaginal and anal penetrations with electric batons, and rubbing chili pepper paste on genitals. Sayragul Sauytbay, a teacher who was forced to work in the camps, told the BBC that employees of the internment camp in which she was detained conducted rapes en masse, saying that camp guards "picked the girls and young women they wanted and took them away". She also told the BBC of an organized gang rape, in which a woman around age 21 was forced to make a confession in front of a crowd of 100 other women detained in the camps, before being raped by multiple policemen in front of the assembled crowd. In 2018, a Globe and Mail interview with Sauytbay indicated that she did not personally see violence at the camp, but did witness malnourishment and a complete lack of freedom. Tursunay Ziawudun, a woman who was detained in the internment camps for a period of nine months, told the BBC that women were removed from their cells every night to be raped by Chinese men in masks and that she was subjected to three separate instances of gang rape while detained. In an earlier interview, Ziawudun reported that while she "wasn't beaten or abused" while in the camps, she was instead subjected to long interrogations, forced to watch propaganda, had her hair cut, was under constant surveillance, and kept in cold conditions with poor food, leading to her developing anemia. Qelbinur Sedik, an Uzbek woman from Xinjiang, has stated that Chinese police sexually abused detainees during electric shock tortures, saying that "there were four kinds of electric shock... the chair, the glove, the helmet, and anal rape with a stick".

Chinese government officials deny all allegations that there have been any human rights abuses within the internment camps. Reuters reported in March 2021 that Chinese government officials also disclosed personal medical information of women witnesses in an effort to discredit them.

In February 2021, the BBC released an extensive report which alleged that systematic sexual abuse was taking place within the camps. The gang rapes and sexual torture were alleged to be part of a systemic rape culture which included both policemen and those from outside the camps who pay for time with the prettiest girls. CNN reported in February 2021 about a worker and several former female inmates which survived the camps; they provided details about murder, torture and rape in the camps, which they described as routinely occurring.

Outside internment camps

IUDs and birth control 
China performs regular pregnancy checks on hundreds of thousands of minority women within Xinjiang.

Zenz reported that 80% of "new" Chinese IUD placements (defined in his study as total IUD placements minus IUD removals) in 2018 occurred in Xinjiang, despite the region constituting only 1.8% of the country's population. Assessing Zenz's analysis, Xinjiang University Professor Lin Fangfei argued that the appropriate measure is that 8.7% of IUD operations were performed in Xinjiang.

Zenz reported that birth rates in counties whose majority population consists of ethnic minorities began to fall in 2015, "the very year that the government began to single out the link between population growth and 'religious extremism'". Prior to the recent drops in birth rates, the Uyghur population had had a growth rate 2.6 times that of the Han between 2005 and 2015. According to Zenz's analysis of Chinese government documents, the Chinese government had planned to sterilize between 14% and 34% of childbearing-age married women in two predominantly Uyghur counties in 2019, while seeking to sterilize 80% of childbearing-age women in four rural prefectures in Xinjiang's south that are primarily inhabited by ethnic minorities.

According to a fax provided to CNN by the Xinjiang regional government, birth rates in the Xinjiang region fell by 32.68% from 2017 to 2018. In 2019, the birth rates fell by 24% year over year, a significantly greater drop than the 4.2% decline in births experienced across the entire People's Republic of China. According to Zenz, population growth rates in the two largest Uyghur prefectures in Xinjiang, Kashgar and Hotan, fell by 84% between 2015 and 2018.

According to Adrian Zenz, Chinese government documents mandate that birth control violations of Uyghurs are punishable by extrajudicial internment. Official records from Karakax County between 2017 and 2019 leaked to the Financial Times showed that the most common reason for detaining Uyghurs in camps was violation of family planning policies, with the second most common reason being for practising Islam. A 2018 Karakax government report said it had implemented "maximally strict family planning policies".

Also in 2019, The Heritage Foundation reported that officials forced Uyghur women to take unknown drugs and liquids that caused them to lose consciousness, and sometimes caused them to stop menstruating. In 2020, an Associated Press investigation reported that forced birth control in Xinjiang was "far more widespread and systematic than previously known", and that Chinese authorities had forced IUD insertions, sterilization and abortions upon "hundreds of thousands" of Uyghur and other minority women. Many women stated that they were forced to receive contraceptive implants. The full scale of forced sterilization in Xinjiang is unknown, partly because of the Chinese government's failure to collect or share data, as well as the reluctance of victims to come forward due to stigma. The measures have been compared to China's past one-child policy targeting its Han population.

According to CNN, regional authorities do not dispute the decrease in birth rates but deny that genocide and forced sterilization is occurring; Xinjiang authorities maintain that the decrease in birth rates is due to "the comprehensive implementation of the family planning policy." The Chinese Embassy in the United States said the policy was positive and empowering for Uyghur women, writing that, "in the process of eradicating extremism, the minds of Uygur women were emancipated and gender equality and reproductive health were promoted, making them no longer baby-making machines. They are more confident and independent." Twitter removed the tweet for violating its policies.

Pundits from Detik.com and the Pakistan Observer have challenged the allegations of decreasing Uyghur births, contending that their birth rate was higher than in earlier years and higher than the Han birth rate.

Forced cohabitation, co-sleeping, rape, and abortion

Beginning in 2018, over one million Chinese government workers began forcibly living in the homes of Uyghur families to monitor and assess resistance to assimilation, as well as to watch for frowned-upon religious and cultural practices.

The "Pair Up and Become Family" program assigned Han Chinese men to monitor the homes of Uyghurs and sleep in the same beds as Uyghur women. According to Radio Free Asia, these Han Chinese government workers were trained to call themselves "relatives" and forcibly engaged in co-habitation of Uyghur homes for the purpose of promoting "ethnic unity". Radio Free Asia reports that these men "regularly sleep in the same beds as the wives of men detained in the region's internment camps." Chinese officials maintained that co-sleeping is acceptable, provided that a distance of one meter is maintained between the women and the "relative" assigned to the Uyghur home. Uyghur activists state that no such restraint takes place, citing pregnancy and forced marriage numbers, and name the program a campaign of "mass rape disguised as 'marriage'." Human Rights Watch has condemned the program as a "deeply invasive forced assimilation practice", while the World Uyghur Congress states that it represents the "total annihilation of the safety, security and well-being of family members."

A 37-year-old pregnant woman from the Xinjiang region said that she attempted to give up her Chinese citizenship to live in Kazakhstan but was told by the Chinese government that she needed to come back to China to complete the process. She alleges that officials seized the passports of her and her two children before coercing her into receiving an abortion to prevent her brother from being detained in an internment camp.

A book from Chandos Publishing authored by Guo Rongxing stated that the 1990 Baren Township riot protests were the result of 250 forced abortions imposed upon local Uyghur women by the Chinese government.

Organ harvesting

Ethan Gutmann states that organ harvesting from prisoners of conscience became prevalent when members of the Uyghur ethnic group were targeted in security crackdowns and "strike hard campaigns" during the 1990s. According to Gutmann, organ harvesting from Uyghur prisoners dropped off by 1999 with members of the Falun Gong religious group overtaking the Uyghurs as a source of organs.

In the 2010s, concerns about organ harvesting from Uyghurs resurfaced. According to a unanimous determination by the China Tribunal in May 2020, China has persecuted and medically tested Uyghurs. Its report expressed concerns that Uyghurs were vulnerable to being subject to organ harvesting but did not yet have evidence of its occurrence. In November 2020, Gutmann told RFA that a former hospital in Atsu, China, which had been converted into a Xinjiang internment camp, would allow local officials to streamline the organ harvesting process and provide a steady stream of harvested organs from Uyghurs. Later, in December 2020, human rights activists and independent researchers told Haaretz that individuals detained in the Xinjiang internment camps "are being murdered and their organs harvested." At that time, Gutmann told Haaretz that he estimates that at least 25,000 Uyghurs are killed in Xinjiang for their organs each year and that crematoria have been recently built in the province in order to more easily dispose of victims' bodies. Gutmann said that "fast lanes" were created for the movement of human organs in local airports.

In 2020, a Chinese woman alleged that Uyghurs were killed to provide halal organs for primarily Saudi customers. She also alleged that in one such instance in 2006, 37 Saudi clients received organs from killed Uyghurs at the Department of Liver Transplantation of Tianjin Taida Hospital. Dr. Enver Tohti, a former oncology surgeon in Xinjiang, thought the allegation was credible.

Forced labor 
Throughout the COVID-19 pandemic, the Chinese government has imposed forced labor conditions on Uyghurs.

In January 2020, videos began to surface on Douyin showing large numbers of Uyghurs being placed into airplanes, trains, and busses for transportation to forced factory labor programs. In March 2020, the Chinese government was found to be using the Uyghur minority as forced sweatshop labor. According to a report published by the Australian Strategic Policy Institute (ASPI), no fewer than around 80,000 Uyghurs were forcibly removed from Xinjiang for purposes of forced labor in at least twenty-seven factories around China. According to the Business and Human Rights Resource Centre, a UK-based charity, corporations such as Abercrombie & Fitch, Adidas, Amazon, Apple, BMW, Fila, Gap, H&M, Inditex, Marks & Spencer, Nike, North Face, Puma, PVH, Samsung, and Uniqlo sourced from these factories. Over 570,000 Uyghurs are forced to pick cotton by hand in Xinjiang. According to an archived report from Nankai University, the Chinese forced labor system is designed to reduce Uyghur population density.

In total, the Chinese government has relocated more than 600,000 Uyghurs to industrial workplaces as a part of their forced labor programs.

Outside China 
China has been accused of coordinating efforts to coerce Uyghurs living overseas into returning to China, using family still in China to pressure members of the diaspora not to make trouble. Chinese officials deny these accusations; the government of China regularly denies its role in the abuses of the Uyghur genocide.

China's robust surveillance system extends overseas, with a special emphasis placed on monitoring the Uyghur diaspora. According to the MIT Technology Review "China's hacking of Uyghurs is so aggressive that it is effectively global, extending far beyond the country's own borders. It targets journalists, dissidents, and anyone who raises Beijing's suspicions of insufficient loyalty."

In March 2021 Facebook reported that hackers based in China had been conducting cyberespionage against members of the Uyghur diaspora.

Uyghurs in the United Arab Emirates, Egypt, and Saudi Arabia have been detained and deported back to China, sometimes separating families. CNN reported in June 2021 that "rights activists fear that even as Western nations take China to task over its treatment of Uyghurs, countries in the Middle East and beyond will increasingly be willing to acquiesce to its crackdown on members of the ethnic group at home and abroad." According to the Associated Press, "Dubai also has a history as a place where Uyghurs are interrogated and deported back to China."

A joint report from the Uyghur Human Rights Project and the Oxus Society for Central Asian Affairs found 1,546 cases of Uyghurs being detained and deported at the behest of Chinese authorities in 28 countries from 1997 to March 2021.

Use of biometric and surveillance technology 
Chinese authorities use biometric technology to track individuals. According to Yahir Imin, Chinese authorities drew his blood, scanned his face, recorded his fingerprints, and documented his voice. China collects genetic material from millions of Uyghurs. China uses facial recognition technology to sort people by ethnicity, and uses DNA to tell if an individual is a Uyghur. China has been accused of creating "technologies used for hunting people."

In 2017, security-related construction tripled in Xinjiang. Charles Rollet stated, "projects include not only security cameras but also video analytics hubs, intelligent monitoring systems, big data centers, police checkpoints, and even drones.", Drone manufacturer DJI began providing surveillance drones to local police in 2017. According to ASPI, the Ministry of Public Security invested billions of dollars in two government plans: the Skynet project (天网工程) and the Sharp Eyes project (雪亮工程). These two projects attempted to use facial recognition to "resolutely achieve no blind spots, no gaps, no blank spots" by 2020. A report by ASPI highlighted Morgan Stanley's claim that, by 2020, 400 million surveillance cameras were to be operating. Chinese companies including SenseTime, CloudWalk, Yitu, Megvii, and Hikvision built algorithms to allow the Chinese government to track the Muslim minority group.

In July 2020, the United States Department of Commerce sanctioned 11 Chinese firms, including two subsidiaries of BGI Group, for violating the human rights of Uyghur Muslims, by exploiting their DNA. BGI Group along with Abu Dhabi-based AI and cloud computing firm Group 42 – accused of espionage in 2019 – were named by the US departments of Homeland Security and State in an October 2020 warning issued to Nevada against the use of the 200,000 COVID-19 test kits donated by UAE under the partnership of G42 and the BGI Group. US intelligence agencies warned foreign powers who were exploiting patients' medical samples to dig into their medical history, genetic traits, and illnesses.

Biometric data 
Around 2013, Xinjiang Party secretary Chen Quanguo launched "Physicals for All", purportedly a medical care program. "Every Xinjiang resident between the ages of twelve and 65" was required to provide DNA samples. Also collected were data on "blood types, fingerprints, voice-prints, iris patterns". Officials in Tumxuk gathered hundreds of blood samples. Tumxuk was named a "major battlefield for Xinjiang's security work" by the state news media. In January 2018, a forensic DNA lab overseen by the Institute of Forensic Science of China was built there. Lab documents  showed that it used software created by Thermo Fisher Scientific, a Massachusetts company. This software was used in correspondence to create genetic sequencers, helpful in analyzing DNA. In response, Thermo Fisher declared in February that it would cease sales to the Xinjiang region as a result of "fact-specific assessments".

GPS tracking of cars 
Security officials ordered residents in China's northwest region to install GPS tracking devices in their vehicles, allowing authorities to track their movements. Authorities said that it "is necessary to counteract the activities of Islamist extremists and separatists". An announcement from officials in Bayingolin Mongol Autonomous Prefecture proclaimed that "there is a severe threat from international terrorism, and cars have been used as a key means of transport for terrorists as well as constantly serving as weapons. It is, therefore, necessary to monitor and track all vehicles in the prefecture."

Classification of abuses

Special purpose tribunals, scholars, commentators, journalists, governments, politicians, and diplomats from many countries have labeled China's actions variously as genocide, cultural genocide, ethnocide and/or crimes against humanity.

Ethnocide or cultural genocide 
In 2008, Michael Clarke, an Australian terrorism scholar, noted that "there has emerged within the Uighur émigré community a tendency to portray the Uighurs as experiencing a form of 'cultural genocide'", citing as an example a 2004 speech by World Uyghur Congress president Erkin Alptekin. In a 2012 Wall Street Journal op-ed, Uyghur activist Rebiya Kadeer described the CCP following "policies of Uighur cultural genocide". In 2018, UCL human rights scholar Kate Cronin-Furman argued in 2018 that the Chinese state policies constituted cultural genocide.

In July 2019, German academic Adrian Zenz wrote in the Journal of Political Risk that the situation in Xinjiang constituted a cultural genocide; his research was later cited by BBC News and other news organizations. James Leibold, a professor at Australia's La Trobe University, called that same month the treatment of Uyghurs by the Chinese government a "cultural genocide", and stated that "in their own words, party officials are 'washing brains' and 'cleansing hearts' to 'cure' those bewitched by extremist thoughts." The term was used in editorials, such as in The Washington Post, at this point.

Since the release of the Xinjiang papers and the China Cables in November 2019, various journalists and researchers have called the Chinese government's treatment of Uyghurs an ethnocide or a cultural genocide. In November 2019, Zenz described the classified documents as confirming "that this is a form of cultural genocide". Foreign Policy published an article by Azeem Ibrahim in which he called the Chinese treatment of Uyghurs a "deliberate and calculated campaign of cultural genocide" after the release of the Xinjiang papers and China Cables.

Since June 2020, scholars, commentators, and lawyers have increasingly referred to the human rights situation in Xinjiang as a genocide, rather than a cultural genocide.

Genocide 
In April 2019, Cornell University anthropologist Magnus Fiskesjö wrote in Inside Higher Ed that mass arrests of ethnic minority academics and intellectuals in Xinjiang indicated that "the Chinese regime's current campaign against the native Uighur, Kazakh and other peoples is already a genocide." Later, in 2020, Fiskejö wrote in academic journal Monde Chinois that "[t]he evidence for genocide is thus already massive, and must, at the very least, be regarded as sufficient for prosecution under international law... the number of competent authorities around the world concurring that this is indeed genocide are increasing."

In June 2020, after an Associated Press investigation found that Uyghurs were being subjected to mass forced sterilizations and forced abortions in Xinjiang, scholars increasingly have referred to the abuses in Xinjiang as a genocide.

In July 2020, Zenz said an interview with National Public Radio (NPR) that he had previously argued that the actions of the Chinese government are a cultural genocide, not a "literal genocide", but that one of the five criteria from the Genocide Convention was satisfied by more recent developments concerning the suppression of birth rates so "we do need to probably call it a genocide". The same month, the last colonial governor of British Hong Kong, Chris Patten, said that the "birth control campaign" was "arguably something that comes within the terms of the UN views on sorts of genocide".

Although China is not a member of the International Criminal Court, on 6 July 2020 the self-proclaimed East Turkistan Government-in-Exile and the East Turkistan National Awakening Movement filed a complaint with the ICC calling for it to investigate PRC officials for crimes against Uyghurs including allegations of genocide. The ICC responded in December 2020 and "asked for more evidence before it will be willing to open an investigation into claims of genocide against Uighur people by China, but has said it will keep the file open for such further evidence to be submitted."

An August 2020 Quartz article reported that some scholars hesitate to label the human rights abuses in Xinjiang as a "full-blown genocide", preferring the term "cultural genocide", but that increasingly many experts were calling them "crimes against humanity" or "genocide". In August 2020 the spokesperson for Joe Biden's presidential campaign described China's actions as genocide.

In October 2020, the U.S. Senate introduced a bipartisan resolution designating the human rights abuses perpetrated by the Chinese government against the Uyghur people and other ethnic minorities in Xinjiang as genocide. Around the same time, the House of Commons of Canada issued a statement that its Subcommittee on International Human Rights of the Standing Committee on Foreign Affairs and International Development was persuaded that the Chinese Communist Party's actions in Xinjiang constitute genocide as laid out in the Genocide Convention. The 2020 annual report by the Congressional-Executive Commission on China referred to the Chinese government's treatment of Uyghurs as "crimes against humanity and possibly genocide."

In January 2021, U.S. secretary of state Mike Pompeo announced that the U.S. government would officially designate the crimes against the Uyghurs and other Turkic and Muslim people living in China as a genocide. This declaration, which came in the final hours of the Trump administration, had not been made earlier due to a worry that it could disrupt trade talks between the US and China. On the allegations of crimes against humanity Pompeo asserted that "These crimes are ongoing and include: the arbitrary imprisonment or other severe deprivation of physical liberty of more than one million civilians, forced sterilization, torture of a large number of those arbitrarily detained, forced labor and the imposition of draconian restrictions on freedom of religion or belief, freedom of expression and freedom of movement."

On 19 January 2021, incoming U.S. president Joe Biden's secretary of state nominee Antony Blinken was asked during his confirmation hearings whether he agreed with Pompeo's conclusion that the CCP had committed genocide against the Uyghurs, he contended "That would be my judgment as well." During her confirmation hearings Joe Biden's nominee to be the US ambassador to the United Nations Linda Thomas-Greenfield stated that she believed what was currently happening in Xinjiang was a genocide, adding "I lived through and experienced and witnessed a genocide in Rwanda."

The US designation was followed by Canada's House of Commons and the Dutch parliament, each passing a non-binding motion in February 2021 to recognize China's actions as genocide.

In January 2021, the United States Holocaust Memorial Museum initially stated that, "[t]here is a reasonable basis to believe that the government of China is committing crimes against humanity." In November 2021, the United States Holocaust Memorial Museum revised its stance to state that the "Chinese government may be committing genocide against the Uyghurs."

In February 2021, a report released by the Essex Court Chambers concluded that "there is a very credible case that acts carried out by the Chinese government against the Uighur people in Xinjiang Uighur Autonomous Region amount to crimes against humanity and the crime of genocide, and describes how the minority group has been subject to "enslavement, torture, rape, enforced sterilisation and persecution." "Victims have been "forced to remain in stress positions for an extended period of time, beaten, deprived of food, shackled and blindfolded", it said. The legal team stated that they had seen "prolific credible evidence" of sterilisation procedures carried out on women, including forced abortions, saying the human rights abuses "clearly constitute a form of genocidal conduct".

According to a March 2021 Newlines Institute report that was written by over 50 global China, genocide, and international law experts, the Chinese government breached every article in the Genocide Convention, writing, "China's long-established, publicly and repeatedly declared, specifically targeted, systematically implemented, and fully resourced policy and practice toward the Uyghur group is inseparable from 'the intent to destroy in whole or in part' the Uyghur group as such." The report cited credible reports of mass deaths under the mass internment drive, while Uighur leaders were selectively sentenced to death or sentenced to long-term imprisonment. "Uyghurs are suffering from systematic torture and cruel, inhumane, and degrading treatment, including rape, sexual abuse, and public humiliation, both inside and outside the camps", the report stated. The report argued that these policies are directly orchestrated by the highest levels of state, including Xi and the top officials of the Chinese Communist Party in Xinjiang. It also reported that the Chinese government gave explicit orders to "eradicate tumours", "wipe them out completely", "destroy them root and branch", "round up everyone", and "show absolutely no mercy", in regards to Uyghurs, and that camp guards reportedly follow orders to uphold the system in place until "Kazakhs, Uyghurs, and other Muslim nationalities, would disappear...until all Muslim nationalities would be extinct". According to the report "Internment camps contain designated "interrogation rooms" where Uyghur detainees are subjected to consistent and brutal torture methods, including beatings with metal prods, electric shocks, and whips."

In June 2021, the Canadian Anthropology Society issued a statement on Xinjiang in which the organization stated, "expert testimony and witnessing, and irrefutable evidence from the Chinese Government's own satellite imagery, documents, and eyewitness reports, overwhelmingly confirms the scale of the genocide."

In December 2021, a coalition of Jewish organizations, including the American Jewish Committee and the Rabbinical Assembly, issued an open letter to President Joe Biden urging additional action in response to the Uyghur genocide.

Crimes against humanity 
In June 2019, the China Tribunal, an independent judicial investigation into forced organ transplantation in China concluded that crimes against humanity had been committed beyond reasonable doubt against China's Uyghur Muslim and Falun Gong populations.

The Asia-Pacific Centre for the Responsibility to Protect at the University of Queensland concluded in November that evidence of atrocities in Xinjiang "likely meets the requirements of the following crimes against humanity: persecution, imprisonment, enforced disappearance, torture, forced sterilisation, and enslavement" and that "It is arguable that genocidal acts have occurred in Xinjiang, in particular acts of imposing measures to prevent births and forcible transfers." In December, lawyers David Matas and Sarah Teich wrote in Toronto Star that "One distressing present day example [of genocide] is the atrocities faced by the Uighur population in Xinjiang, China."

In 2021 the US Office of the Legal Advisor concluded that although the situation in Xinjiang amounted to crimes against humanity, there was insufficient evidence to prove genocide.

International responses

Reactions by supranational organizations

Reactions at the United Nations 

In July 2019, 22 countries issued a joint letter to the 41st session of the United Nations Human Rights Council (UNHRC), condemning China's mass detention of Uyghurs and other minorities, calling upon China to "refrain from the arbitrary detention and restrictions on freedom of movement of Uyghurs, and other Muslim and minority communities in Xinjiang". In the same session, 50 countries issued a joint letter supporting China's Xinjiang policies, criticizing the practice of "politicizing human rights issues". The letter stated, "China has invited a number of diplomats, international organizations officials and journalist to Xinjiang" and that "what they saw and heard in Xinjiang completely contradicted what was reported in the media."

In October 2019, 23 countries issued a joint statement to the UN urging China to "uphold its national and international obligations and commitments to respect human rights". In response, 54 countries (including China itself) issued a joint statement supporting China's Xinjiang policies. The statement "spoke positively of the results of counter-terrorism and de-radicalization measures in Xinjiang and noted that these measures have effectively safeguarded the basic human rights of people of all ethnic groups."

In February 2020, the UN demanded unobstructed access in advance of a proposed fact-finding visit to the region.

In October 2020, more countries at the UN joined the condemnation of China over human rights abuses in Xinjiang with German Ambassador Christoph Heusgen speaking on behalf of the group. The total number of countries that condemned China increased to 39, while the total number of countries that defended China decreased to 45. Sixteen countries that defended China in 2019 did not do so in 2020.

The UN High Commissioner for Human Rights (HCHR) began to discuss the possibility of a visit to Xinjiang with China in order to examine "the impact on human rights of its policies" in September 2020. Since then, the HCHR's office has since been negotiating terms of access to China, but the High Commissioner has not visited the country. In a February 2021 speech to the UNHRC, the Chinese Foreign Minister stated that Xinjiang is "always open" and the country "welcomes the High Commissioner for Human Rights (HCHR) to visit Xinjiang". At a March 2021 meeting of the UNHRC, the United States ambassador condemned China's human rights abuses in Xinjiang as "crimes against humanity and genocide".

China has turned down multiple requests from the UN HCHR to investigate the region. In January 2022, unidentified sources told the South China Morning Post that UN rights chief Michelle Bachelet had secured a visit to Xinjiang, not to be framed as an investigation, some time during the first half of the year, as long as her office doesn't agree to the U.S. request of publishing its Xinjiang report ahead of the Beijing Winter Olympics. The visit occurred in May 2022. In a statement released by the UN, Bachelet said that she raised concerns in Xinjiang about the broad application of counter-terrorism and de-radicalisation measures (including their impacts on Uyghurs and other Muslim minorities) and encouraged the government to review such policies to ensure they fully comply with international human rights standards.  Bachelet stated that while she was unable to investigate the full scale of the vocational educational and training centres (VETC), she raised with the Chinese government concerns about the lack of independent judicial oversight for the program, and said that the government provided assurances that the VETC system had been dismantled. U.S. rights advocates criticized Bachelet's visit as a propaganda victory for Beijing.

On August 31, 2022, Bachelet released a report on China's treatment of Uyghur Muslims and other Muslim minority groups in Xinjiang, the OHCHR Assessment of human rights concerns in the Xinjiang Uyghur Autonomous Region, People's Republic of China. The report found that China's treatment of these groups may amount to crimes against humanity. The report concludes that "serious human rights violations have been committed" in the province, which the report attributes to China's "application of counter-terrorism and counter-'extremism' strategies" targeting Uyghur Muslims and other Muslim minority groups. The report also said that "Allegations of patterns of torture or ill-treatment, including forced medical treatment and adverse conditions of detention, are credible, as are allegations of individual incidents of sexual and gender-based violence". China opposed the release of the report and claimed that it is based on "disinformation and lies". China also claimed that "All ethnic groups, including the Uygur, are equal members of the Chinese nation. Xinjiang has taken actions to fight terrorism and extremism in accordance with the law, effectively curbing the frequent occurrences of terrorist activities". On October 6, 2022, the UNHCR voted down a proposal to debate the alleged human rights abuses in Xinjiang.

Reactions at the European Union 
In 2019, the European Parliament awarded its Sakharov Prize for Freedom and Thought to Ilham Tohti, a Uyghur intellectual and activist who had been sentenced to life in prison on charges pertaining to Uyghur separatism. As of March 2021, China has prohibited European Union diplomats from visiting Tohti. The European Union has called upon China to release Tohti from his detention in prison.

In March 2021, European Union ambassadors agreed on sanctions, including travel bans and asset freezes, against four Chinese officials and one Chinese entity for human rights abuses against Uyghurs. Among those sanctioned by the EU was Zhu Hailun who was described as the architect of the indoctrination program. In the same month, negotiations for a group of Ambassadors from European Union countries to visit Xinjiang stalled due to the Chinese government's denial of their request to visit Ilham Tohti, an imprisoned Uyghur scholar.

Reactions by country

Africa 
Several African countries, including Algeria, the Democratic Republic of the Congo, Egypt, Nigeria, and Somalia, signed a July 2019 letter that publicly praised China's human rights record and dismissed reported abuses in Xinjiang. Other African countries, including Angola, Burundi, Cameroon, the Central African Republic, Madagascar, Morocco, Mozambique and Sudan, signed an October 2019 letter that publicly expressed support for China's treatment of Uyghurs.

Americas

Canada
In July 2020, The Globe and Mail reported that human rights activists, including retired politician Irwin Cotler, were encouraging the Parliament of Canada to recognize the Chinese actions against Uyghurs as genocide and impose sanctions on the officials responsible.

On 21 October 2020, the Subcommittee on International Human Rights (SDIR) of the Canadian House of Commons Standing Committee on Foreign Affairs and International Development condemned the persecution of Uyghurs and other Turkic Muslims in Xinjiang by the Government of China and concluded that the Chinese Communist Party's actions amount to the genocide of the Uyghurs per the Genocide Convention.

On 22 February 2021, the Canadian House of Commons voted 266–0 to approve a motion that formally recognizes China as committing genocide against its Muslim minorities. Prime Minister Justin Trudeau and his cabinet did not vote. China's Ambassador to Canada responded to the motion by calling the allegations of genocide and forced labor the "lie of the century." In June 2021, Canada's Senate voted 29–33 against a motion to recognize the treatment of Uyghurs as genocide and to call for the 2022 Winter Olympics to be moved out of China should such treatment continue.

On 11 April 2021, Canada issued a travel advisory stating that individuals with "familial or ethnic ties" could be "at risk of arbitrary detention" by Chinese authorities when traveling in the Xinjiang region. Radio Canada International reported that the announcement described that China had been "increasingly detaining ethnic and Muslim minorities in the region without due process."

United States

UN counter-terrorism chief Vladimir Voronkov visited Xinjiang in June 2019. The visit prompted anger from the U.S. State Department. The U.S. has called these visits "highly choreographed" and characterized them as having "propagated false narratives."

In 2020, the United States Congress passed the Uyghur Human Rights Policy Act in reaction to the internment camps. Lawmakers also proposed the Uyghur Forced Labor Prevention Act requiring the assumption that all Xinjiang goods are made with forced labor and therefore banned. In September 2020, the U.S. Department of Homeland Security blocked imports of products from five entities in Xinjiang to combat the use of forced labor, while shelving broader proposed bans. A senior US diplomat called upon other countries to join the United States denunciations against the Chinese government's policies in Xinjiang. Senators Cornyn, Merkley, Cardin, and Rubio signed a letter to request Mike Pompeo, the United States Secretary of State, to issue a determination of genocide. The National Review reports that "U.S. government genocide determinations are an incredibly tricky thing. They require solid evidence to meet the criteria set out under the 1948 Genocide Convention." When determinations are issued there isn't much change or an effect that they will bring in the short run. Although, "there's a strong, well-documented case for a determination in this case." As of November 2020, US Senators Menendez and Cornyn are leading a bipartisan group to recognize the CCP's actions in Xinjiang as a genocide by way of a Senate resolution, which would make the United States Senate the first government to "officially recognize the situation as a genocide."

On 19 January 2021, Pompeo announced that the United States Department of State had determined that "genocide and crimes against humanity" had been perpetrated by China against the Uyghurs, with Pompeo stating: "the People's Republic of China, under the direction and control of the Chinese Communist Party, has committed genocide and crimes against humanity against the predominantly Muslim Uighurs and other ethnic and religious minority groups, including ethnic Kazakhs and Kyrgyz... [i]n the anguished cries from Xinjiang, the U.S. hears the echoes of Nazi Germany, Rwanda, Bosnia and Darfur." The announcement was made on the last full day of the Donald Trump presidency.

At the end of the Trump presidency, the incoming Biden administration had already declared as the Joe Biden 2020 presidential campaign that such a determination should be made, and that America would continue to recognize the Xinjiang activity as a genocide. On 16 February 2021, U.S. President Joe Biden commented in a CNN town hall meeting in Wisconsin that Xi Jinping's rationale for justifying his policies, the idea that there "must be a united, tightly controlled China", derives from the fact that "Culturally, there are different norms that each country and their leaders are expected to follow." He also promised in the same meeting that "there will be repercussions for China" for its human rights violations. Some sources interpreted Biden's statements as excusing Chinese policy towards Uyghurs on cultural relativist grounds, whereas an opposite view deemed it a misrepresentation.

In July 2021 while speaking at the Singaporean branch of the International Institute for Strategic Studies American Secretary of Defense Lloyd Austin remarked on "genocide and crimes against humanity against Uighur Muslims in Xinjiang."

Asia

Middle East 
Many countries in the Middle East signed a UN document defending China's human rights record. Iraq and Iran have also signed the document while Saudi Arabia and Egypt have been accused of deporting Uyghurs to China. Saudi Arabia supports China's approach in Xinjiang, and on a visit to China in 2019, Crown Prince Mohammed bin Salman stated, “China has the right to carry out anti-terrorism and de-extremization work for its national security.” The United Arab Emirates has formally defended China's human rights records. These countries have appreciated China's respect for the principle of non-interference in other countries' affairs and have therefore placed significance on their economic and political relations.

Qatar
Qatar supported China's policies in Xinjiang until August 21, 2019; Qatar was the first Middle Eastern country to withdraw its defense of the Xinjiang camps.

Israel
In 2021, Israel voted to condemn China's actions in the UNHRC; a sudden break in China–Israel relations.

Post-Soviet states 
Russia, Belarus, Turkmenistan and Tajikistan have expressed support for China's policies in Xinjiang. Russia signed both statements at the UN (in July and October 2019) that supported China's Xinjiang policies. NPR reported that Kazakhstan and "its neighbors in the mostly Muslim region of Central Asia that have benefited from Chinese investment aren't speaking up for the Muslims inside internment camps in China".

South Asia 
Nepal, Pakistan and Sri Lanka have signed a UN document supporting China's policies in Xinjiang.

Pakistan 
In July 2021, Prime Minister Imran Khan said in an interview that he believes "the Chinese version" of the facts pertaining to abuses in Xinjiang and argued that undue attention was being given to Xinjiang relative to human rights violations in other regions of the world, such as in Kashmir.

Southeast Asia 
Cambodia, Laos, Myanmar, and the Philippines have issued statements of support for China's policies. According to The Moscow Times, Thailand, Malaysia, and Cambodia have all deported Uyghur people at China's request. In 2020, Malaysia minister Mohd Redzuan Md Yusof said that Malaysia would not entertain requests from Beijing to extradite Uyghurs if they felt their safety was at risk.

Turkey
In 2019, the Turkish Foreign Ministry issued a statement condemning what it described as China's "reintroduction of concentration camps in the 21st century" and "a great cause of shame for humanity". In response to a question regarding the reported death of Uyghur musician Abdurehim Heyit within the Xinjiang internment camps, a spokesperson for the Turkish Foreign Ministry stated that "more than one million Uyghur Turks incurring arbitrary arrests are subjected to torture and political brainwashing in internment camps and prisons".

In February 2021, authorities arrested Uyghur protesters in Ankara following a complaint by the embassy of China in Turkey. In March 2021, the Turkish parliament rejected a motion to call the Chinese government's treatment of Uyghurs a genocide.

On July 13, 2021, Prime Minister Erdogan told Chinese President Xi Jinping in a bilateral telephone call that it was important to Turkey that Uyghur Muslims live in peace as "equal citizens of China" but that Turkey respected the territorial integrity and sovereignty of China.

In 2022, Turkey issued a joint statement with 49 UN member states condemning the Chinese government's persecution of Uyghurs and other Turkic Muslims in Xinjiang.

Europe

Belgium
In May 2021, testimony about the situation in Xinjiang to the foreign affairs committee of the Belgian chamber of representatives had to be postponed after a massive DDOS attack on the .be domain. In June 2021, the Belgian Parliament's foreign relations committee passed a motion condemning the abuses as crimes against humanity and stating that there was a "serious risk of genocide" in Xinjiang.

Czech Republic
In June 2021, the Czech Senate unanimously passed a motion condemning the abuses against the Uyghurs as both genocide and crimes against humanity.

France
In December 2020, France said that it would oppose the proposed Comprehensive Agreement on Investment between China and the European Union over the use of forced labour of Uyghurs. In February 2021, the French Foreign Minister Jean-Yves Le Drian denounced "institutionalised repression" of Uyghurs at the UNHRC.
French parliament in January 2022 denounced a "genocide" by China against its Uyghur Muslim population in a resolution.

Finland
In March 2021 Finland's Prime Minister Sanna Marin tweeted a condemnation of the human rights situation in Xinjiang.

Lithuania 
In May 2021, the Lithuanian Parliament passed a resolution recognizing that the Chinese government's human rights abuses against the Uyghurs constitute genocide.

Netherlands

On February 25, 2021, the Netherlands parliament passed a non-binding resolution declaring the Chinese government's actions against the Uyghurs as a genocide.

Ukraine
Ukraine had originally signed onto a 22 June 2021 statement to the UNHRC which called for independent observers to be provided immediate access to Xinjiang, but withdrew its signature two days later. Ukrainian lawmakers later stated that China had forced the policy pivot by threatening to limit trade and block a scheduled shipment of at least 500,000 COVID-19 vaccine doses.

United Kingdom
On 10 October 2020, Britain's Shadow Foreign Secretary, Lisa Nandy suggested that Britain must oppose giving China a seat on the UNHRC in protest against its abuse of Uyghur Muslims. She added that the UN must be allowed to conduct an inquiry into possible crimes against humanity in Xinjiang.

A letter was signed in September 2020 by more than 120 MPs and peers, including senior Tories and Liberal Democrat leader Sir Ed Davey, which accused China of a "systematic and calculated programme of ethnic cleansing" against the country's Uyghur minority, and compared China to Nazi Germany.

In January 2021, the British parliament rejected a resolution which would have banned the UK from trading with countries engaged in genocides. Prime Minister Boris Johnson opposed the resolution.

In January 2021, foreign secretary Dominic Raab made a statement over China's human rights violations against Uyghurs, accusing China of "extensive and invasive surveillance targeting minorities, systematic restrictions on Uyghur culture, education, and the practice of Islam, and the widespread use of forced labour."

In January 2021, The Guardian reported that the UK government "fended off an all-party effort to give the courts a chance to designate China guilty of genocide on the day that Blinken said China was intent on genocide in Xinjiang province."

In March 2021, the UK and the EU sanctioned four Chinese officials, including Zhu Hailun and Wang Junzheng, for their involvement in violating the human rights of Uyghur Muslims in Xinjiang. In response, China imposed sanctions on nine UK citizens for spreading "lies and disinformation" about human rights abuses in Xinjiang.

On 22 April 2021, the House of Commons unanimously passed a non-binding parliamentary motion declaring China's human rights abuses in Xinjiang as a genocide.

Oceania

Australia
In September 2019, Australian Foreign Minister Marise Payne stated, "I have previously raised Australia's concerns about reports of mass detentions of Uyghurs and other Muslim peoples in Xinjiang. We have consistently called for China to cease the arbitrary detention of Uyghurs and other Muslim groups. We have raised these concerns—and we will continue to raise them—both bilaterally and in relevant international meetings." In March 2021, the federal government blocked a motion by Rex Patrick to recognize China's treatment of the Uyghurs as a genocide.

New Zealand
In 2018, New Zealand prime minister Jacinda Ardern raised the issue of Xinjiang while visiting Guangdong Party Secretary Leader Li Xi. Ardern also raised such concerns during China's periodic review at the UN in November 2018, to immediate pushback from China.

Ardern discussed Xinjiang privately with Xi Jinping during a 2019 visit to Beijing after the Christchurch mosque shootings. The New York Times accused New Zealand of tiptoeing around the issue for economic reasons as the country exports many products to China, including milk, meat, and wine.

On 5 May 2021, the New Zealand Parliament adopted a motion declaring that "severe human rights abuses" were occurring against the Uyghur people in Xinjiang. An earlier version of the motion proposed by the opposition ACT Party had accused the Chinese Government of committing genocide against the Uyghurs. The ruling Labour Party had opposed including the word "genocide" in the motion, leading to an amended version criticising "severe human rights abuses."

Other reactions

Non-governmental organizations and research institutions

In January 2020, President Ghulam Osman Yaghma of the East Turkistan Government-in-Exile wrote that "the world is silently witnessing another Holocaust like genocide in East Turkistan....as the President of East Turkistan Government-in-Exile, on behalf of East Turkistan and its people, we again call on the international community including world governments to acknowledge and recognize China's brutal Holocaust like the oppression of East Turkistan's people as a genocide."

The Uyghur American Association previously expressed concern at the deportation of 20 Uyghur refugees from Cambodia to China in 2009, and has said that Beijing's military approach to terrorism in Xinjiang is state terrorism. The United States Holocaust Memorial Museum has issued statements describing the conditions in Xinjiang as crimes against humanity. According to the United States Holocaust Memorial Museum, "the Chinese government's campaign against the Uyghurs in Xinjiang is multi-faceted and systematic. It is characterized by mass detention, forced labor, and discriminatory laws, and supported through high-tech manners of surveillance."

As of July 2020, Amnesty International had not taken a position on whether the Chinese government's treatment of Uyghurs constituted a genocide. In June 2021, Amnesty released a report saying that China's treatment of Uyghurs constituted crimes against humanity. Genocide Watch "considers the forced sterilizations and forcible transfer of children of Uyghurs and other Turkic minorities in Xinjiang to be acts of genocide" and subsequently issued a Genocide Emergency Alert in November 2020.

In September 2020, nearly two dozen activist groups, including the Uyghur Human Rights Project, Genocide Watch, and the European Centre for the Responsibility to Protect, signed an open letter urging the UNHRC to investigate whether crimes against humanity or genocide were taking place in Xinjiang.

In March 2021, the Newlines Institute for Strategy and Policy, a think tank at the Fairfax University of America, released a report stating that the "People's Republic of China bears State responsibility for committing genocide against the Uyghurs in breach of the 1948 Convention on the Prevention and Punishment of the Crime of Genocide." According to the report, the determination of the "intent to destroy the Uyghurs as a group is derived from objective proof, consisting of comprehensive state policy and practice, which President Xi Jinping, the highest authority in China, set in motion." The legal analysis of the Newlines Institute concludes that the People's Republic of China is responsible for breaches of each provision of Article II of the Genocide Convention.

Human Rights Watch followed in April 2021 with a report outlining "that the Chinese government has committed—and continues to commit—crimes against humanity against the Turkic Muslim population." The report made in collaboration with the Stanford Human Rights & Conflict Resolution Clinic also sets out recommendations for concerned governments and the UN.

Uyghur Tribunal 

The Uyghur Tribunal, a "people's tribunal" based in the United Kingdom, began to hold hearings in June 2021 to examine evidence in order to evaluate whether China's abuses against Uyghurs constitute genocide under the Genocide Convention. The tribunal was chaired by Geoffrey Nice, the lead prosecutor in the trial of Slobodan Milošević, who announced the creation of the tribunal in September 2020.

On 9 December 2021, the tribunal concluded that China has committed genocide against the Uyghurs via birth control and sterilization measures. The tribunal also found evidence of crimes against humanity, torture and sexual abuse. The tribunal's final determination does not legally bind any government to take action.

Multinational corporations

In reaction to the proposed Uyghur Forced Labor Prevention Act in 2020 to impose sanctions on "any foreign person who 'knowingly engages'" and require firms to disclose their dealings with Xinjiang, the president of the American Apparel & Footwear Association said that blanket import bans on cotton or other products from Xinjiang from such legislation would "wreak havoc" on legitimate supply chains in the apparel industry because Xinjiang cotton exports are often intermingled with cotton from other countries and there is no available origin-tracing technology for cotton fibers. On September 22, 2020, the US Chamber of Commerce issued a letter stating that the act "would prove ineffective and may hinder efforts to prevent human rights abuses." Major companies with supply chain ties to Xinjiang, including Apple Inc., Nike, Inc. and The Coca-Cola Company, have lobbied Congress to weaken the legislation and amend its provisions.

In February 2021, a policy was established by 12 Japanese companies to cease business deals with some of the Chinese firms involved in or benefitting from forced labor of Uyghurs in Xinjiang.

Both Nike and Adidas have criticized human rights abuses in Xinjiang and pledged not to do business in the region; their sales in China subsequently declined. After a December 2022 report stated that nearly every global automaker had ties to Uyghur forced labor, United Auto Workers called for all automakers to cut off any supply chain links to Xinjiang.

Religious groups
In July 2020, Marie van der Zyl, the President of the Board of Deputies of British Jews, pointed to similarities between the mass detention of Uyghur Muslims and concentration camps in the Holocaust. On International Holocaust Remembrance Day in January 2021, van der Zyl urged the Chinese government to step back from committing atrocities.

In December 2020, the Chief Rabbi of the United Hebrew Congregations of the Commonwealth Ephraim Mirvis published an op-ed in The Guardian on the occasion of Hanukkah in which he condemned the persecution of the Uyghurs and called for international action to address the "unfathomable mass atrocity" taking place in China. The Chief Rabbi generally refrains from making comments on non-Jewish political issues. Mirvis is part of a wider Jewish protest movement which has sprung up in opposition to the human rights abuses in Xinjiang, protesters are largely motivated by memories of the Holocaust and a desire to prevent a repeat of that horror. In addition to liberal British Jews who have long been involved in international human rights issue the plight of the Uyghur also draws significant interest and support from Britain's Orthodox community. According to Orthodox Rabbi Herschel Gluck "This is something that is felt very deeply by the community. They feel that if 'Never again' is a term that needs to be used, this is certainly one of the situations where it applies."

In December 2020, a coalition of American Muslim groups criticized the Organisation of Islamic Cooperation for failing to speak up to prevent the abuse of the Uyghurs and accused member states of being "cowed by China's power". The groups included the Council on American–Islamic Relations.

In August 2020, a group of 70 British faith leaders including imams, rabbis, bishops, cardinals, and an archbishop publicly declared that the Uyghurs faced "one of the most egregious human tragedies since the Holocaust" and called for those responsible to be held accountable. The group included the representative of the Dalai Lama in Europe and Rowan Williams, former Archbishop of Canterbury.

In March 2021, a group of sixteen Rabbis and a Cantor from across California's Jewish religious spectrum sent a letter to Representative Ted Lieu urging him to take action in support of the Uyghurs. The grassroots organization Jewish Movement for Uyghur Freedom works to bridge the gap between the Uyghur and Jewish communities as well as advocate on their behalf. In contrast to the earlier Save Darfur campaign major Jewish donors and organizations have tread softly due to a fear of reprisals against themselves and associated businesses by the Chinese government. Major Jewish groups which have spoken out on the Uyghur genocide or taken policy positions on it include the Union for Reform Judaism, the American Jewish Committee, the Rabbinical Assembly, the Anti-Defamation League, and the Conference of Presidents of Major American Jewish Organizations.

In April 2021, the Jewish Council for Public Affairs, a U.S-based public policy group composed of organizations representing Reconstructionist, Reform, Conservative, and Orthodox Jews, urged the Jewish community to "call upon the [Chinese Communist Party] to end the genocide and exploitation of the Uyghurs, as well as halt the oppression of other ethnic and religious minorities living within its borders."

In 2021, a number of Jewish organizations in the United Kingdom incorporated the situation in Xinjiang into their Holocaust Memorial Day remembrances and commemorations.

Protests
 
The Chinese Consulate in Almaty, Kazakhstan has been the site of a daily protest demonstration, primarily made up of old women whose relatives are believed to be detained in China. In 2020 Uyghur protesters outside the Consulate General of China, Los Angeles were joined by activists representing Tibet, Taiwan, and Hong Kong.

Regular protests from local Uyghurs have been held at Chinese diplomatic sites in Istanbul, Turkey, where several hundred Uyghur women protested on International Women's Day in March 2021. In London regular protests outside an outpost of the Chinese embassy have been organized by an Orthodox Jewish man from the local neighborhood. He has held protests at least twice a week since February 2019.

In March 2021, hundreds of Uyghurs living in Turkey protested the visit of Chinese Foreign Minister Wang Yi to Istanbul by gathering both in Beyazit Square and near China's Consulate-General in Istanbul. Over two-dozen NGOs that focus on the rights of Uyghurs were involved in organizing the protests.

In October 2021, basketball player Enes Kanter protested against abuses against the Uyghurs by the Chinese state by wearing sneakers on court which said "Modern Day Slavery" and "No More Excuses." He also criticized Nike for being silent on injustices in China. Kanter tweeted "It is so disappointing that the governments and leaders of Muslim-majority countries are staying silent while my Muslim brothers and sisters are getting killed, raped, and tortured."

2022 Winter Olympics Boycott

In the aftermath of the 2019 leak of the Xinjiang papers which made public Chinese policies towards the Uyghurs, calls were made for a boycott of the 2022 Winter Olympics. In a 30 July 2020 letter, the World Uyghur Congress urged the International Olympic Committee (IOC) to reconsider the decision to hold the Olympics in Beijing. In a non-binding motion in February 2021, the Canadian House of Commons called for the IOC to move the Olympics to a new location. The IOC met with activists in late 2020 about their request to move the Olympics. In March 2021, the President of the International Olympic Committee Thomas Bach opposed a boycott, which would also damage the IOC image and finances, and said that the IOC must stay out of politics. On 6 April 2021, a senior U.S. State Department official stated that the department's position "on the 2022 Olympics has not changed" and that it has not "discussed and [is] not discussing any joint boycott with allies and partners." Australia, Belgium, Canada, Denmark, India, Kosovo, Lithuania, Taiwan, the United Kingdom, and the United States announced diplomatic boycotts of the 2022 Winter Olympics.

Legal cases 
On 4 January 2022, nineteen Uyghurs, with the help of lawyer Gulden Sonmez, filed a criminal case for torture, rape, crimes against humanity and genocide in the Istanbul Prosecutor's Office against Chinese officials. Sonmez stated that Turkish legislation recognises universal jurisdiction for the offences alleged in the case.

Publications 

Nury Turkel published the book No Escape: The True Story of China's Genocide of the Uyghurs in 2022." The book documents the treatment of Uyghurs in Xinjiang and was long-listed for the  2022 Moore Prize for Human Rights Writing.

Denial of abuses
The abuses against the Uyghurs and related ethnic groups have been denied by the Chinese government. These denials have been both internal and external. The Chinese government has conducted propaganda campaigns on social media to further denial of the abuses. In 2021, the Chinese government posted thousands of videos to social media showing residents of Xinjiang denying claims of abuse made by Mike Pompeo; a joint investigation by ProPublica and The New York Times found the videos were part of an influence campaign coordinated by the government propaganda department. They have also used their existing disinformation networks, including social media trolls, to deny the Uyghur genocide.

In 2020, during an interview with Andrew Marr of the BBC, the Chinese ambassador to the UK Liu Xiaoming denied any abuse against Uyghurs despite being shown drone footage of what appeared to be shackled Uyghur, and other minority ethnic, prisoners being herded on to trains during a prison transfer. The ambassador also blamed reports of forced sterilisations on "some small group of anti-China elements". In January 2021, Ministry of Foreign Affairs spokesperson Zhao Lijian responded to questions about the Uyghur genocide during a press briefing by stating, "China has no genocide; China has no genocide; China has no genocide, period." In February 2021, Wang Wenbin called the Uyghur genocide the "lie of the century".

The abuses, and the existence of the camp network, have also been denied by a small minority of American left-wing media outlets. These include a left-wing blog called LA Progressive which began publishing denial articles in April 2020, while The Grayzone has been the most influential outlet to publish articles denying "China’s ongoing repression of the Uyghur people". The Grayzone has been featured by Chinese state media, including CGTN and the Global Times. In 2020, Chinese government spokesperson Hua Chunying retweeted a story published by The Grayzone which claimed to have debunked research into the internment camps in Xinjiang.

In February 2021, a Press Gazette investigation found that Facebook had accepted content from Chinese state media outlets such as China Daily and China Global Television Network that denied the mistreatment of Uyghurs.

According to anthropologist and China expert Gerald Roche, writing in The Nation, Xinjiang denialism only aids Chinese and American imperialism. He cited Donald Trump who told Xi Jinping that building internment camps was "exactly the right thing to do."

See also 
 Outline of Genocide studies
 Ethnic minorities in China
 History of the Uyghur people
 History of Xinjiang
 Turkic settlement of the Tarim Basin
 Dzungar genocide
 Dungan Revolt
 Xinjiang conflict
 Xinjiang papers

Explanatory notes

References

Citations

General and cited sources

External links 

 
 Xinjiang Person Search Tool, a search engine launched by Adam Zenz and the Victims of Communism Memorial Foundation that leverages the leaked Xinjiang Police Files to allow family members to directly search for imprisoned relatives by their Chinese ID or name. 

 
2010s in China
2014 establishments in China
2020s in China
21st-century human rights abuses
Anti-Islam sentiment in China
Counterterrorism in China
Crimes against humanity
Cultural assimilation
Cultural genocide
Ethnic cleansing in Asia
Forced migration
Genocidal rape
Genocides in Asia
Human rights abuses in China
Human rights of ethnic minorities in China
Islamophobia in China
Language policy in Xinjiang
Linguistic discrimination
Organ trade
Organ transplantation
Racism in China
Religious persecution by communists
Separatism in China
Torture in China
Xi Jinping
Xinjiang conflict